Santa Will Find You! is an extended play released by American country music artist Chely Wright. It was released on October 26, 2018 by Painted Red Music Group, and The Orchard. Santa Will Find You was Wright's first album collection of holiday songs and her third extended play release in her career. It contained a total of six tracks.

Background and content
Since the release of 2016's I Am the Rain, Chely Wright had not recorded new music. For several years, she had been contemplating the recording of a holiday record. She was partly inspired by the album's title track, which was originally included on Mindy Smith's 2007 album, My Holiday. The song had originally been composed in tribute to military men and women overseas. However, Wright felt the song took new meaning in her recent role of becoming a mother. The extended play contained a total of six new holiday tracks. In a 2018 interview with Billboard, Wright said that she felt ready to make a holiday album: "It's been tugging at me to make a holiday record for a long time, especially since I had a couple songs that have a track record already. I felt like I had a head start on it." 

Along with its title track, additional songs on the record were first cut by other performers. The track, "It Really Is (A Wonderful Life)" was first recorded by the Indigo Girls. Wright later performed the tune at the Christmas tree lighting ceremony in Washington, D.C. before officially recording it for the album. "Christmas Isn't Christmas Time" was composed by Wright and her friend, Richard Marx. A second version of the track was included on the album that was made to resemble that of producer, Phil Spector. "When I hear a Spector record, even when it’s not a Christmas song, it just takes me to Christmas," Wright commented to Rolling Stone. The project was recorded at three separate studios in Nashville, Tennessee: The 515 Studio, Sputnik Sound and the Jigsaw Studio. It was co-produced by Jeremy Lister and Dustin Ransom.

Release and reception

Santa Will Find You! was first released on October 26, 2018 in conjunction with the Painted Red Music Group (Wright's own label), The Orchard and her own self-released company, Chely Wright. The album was offered as a compact disc, vinyl and a digital download. Following its release, Wright commented to Taste of Country that she "hope[s] this music becomes part of a new emotional landscape for listeners." Santa Will Find You! was reviewed positively by Bobby Moore of the music publication, Stomp and Stammer. Moore called its five songs to be "dripping with the down-home vibes craved by her longtime fans and new listeners ." In addition, Moore concluded: "The vibe of this release owes a lot to music still relatively new in ’73, copying the sounds of the season from the singer’s own childhood. That’s not to timestamp songs that sound relevant in 2018 and should beckon new rounds of holiday cheer for years to come." In addition, Robert Crawford of Rolling Stone named its title track one of the magazine's "10 Best Country Songs of the Week" in December 2018.

Track listing

Personnel
All credits are adapted from the liner notes of Santa Willd Find You! and Allmusic.

Musical personnel
 Vinnie Ciesielski – flugelhorn, trumpet
 Court Clement – 12-string electric guitar, acoustic guitar, electric guitar
 Eleonore Denig – violin
 Tara Johnson – French horn
 Emily Kohavi – viola, violin
 Besty Lamb – viola
 Jeremy Lister – Tambourine, background vocals
 Richard Marx – featured artist
 Emily Nelson – cello
 Dustin Ransom – Background vocals, bass, drums, fender rhodes, acoustic guitar, electric guitar, Hammond B3, hand-clapping, harpsichord, organ, piano, sleigh bells, tambourine, toy piano, tubular bells, Wurlitzer piano
 Tyler Summers – Baritone saxophone, clarinet
 Oscar Utterström – Trombone
 Kevin Whitsett – Upright bass
 Chely Wright – lead vocals, background vocals

Technical personnel
 Adam Bokesch – engineer
 Joe Causey – mastering
 Mitch Dane – additional production, engineer
 Charlene Daniels – photography
 Marla Frazee – cover art
 Jeremy Lister – orchestral arrangements, producer
 Jonathan Lister – mixing assistant
 Richie Lister – orchestral arrangements
 Dustin Ransom – engineer, mixing, orchestral arrangements, producer
 Koehn Terry – assistant engineer

Charts

Release history

References

2018 EPs
Chely Wright albums
Christmas EPs
Country Christmas albums